Max Culp Runager (March 24, 1956 – June 30, 2017) was a professional American football punter in the National Football League for eleven seasons for the Philadelphia Eagles, the San Francisco 49ers, and the Cleveland Browns.  A graduate of Orangeburg-Wilkinson High School, Runager played college football at the University of South Carolina. He punted for two Super Bowl teams, the Philadelphia Eagles in 1980 and the San Francisco 49ers in 1984.

References

1956 births
2017 deaths
People from Greenwood, South Carolina
American football punters
South Carolina Gamecocks football players
Philadelphia Eagles players
Players of American football from South Carolina
San Francisco 49ers players
Cleveland Browns players
Orangeburg-Wilkinson High School alumni